Tikhonino is a rural locality (a village) in Kubenskoye Rural Settlement, Kharovsky District, Vologda Oblast, Russia. The population was 2 as of 2002.

Geography 
Tikhonino is located 18 km northwest of Kharovsk (the district's administrative centre) by road. Gridinskaya is the nearest rural locality.

References 

Rural localities in Kharovsky District